Anna Maria Barchman Wuytiers-Blaauw (1865-1944) was a Dutch painter.

Biography 
Wuytiers née Blaauw was born on 29 November 1865 in Amsterdam, Netherlands. She studied flower painting under Margaretha Roosenboom. She married Jhr Barchman Wuytiers in 1890.

Wuytiers died on 10 March 1944 in Hilterfingen, Switzerland.

Gallery

References

External links
 

1865 births
1944 deaths
Artists from Amsterdam
19th-century Dutch women artists
20th-century Dutch women artists